Gol Malek (also known as Bol Malek) is a village in Deh Bakri Rural District, in the Central District of Bam County, Kerman Province, Iran. At the 2006 census, its population was 143, in 33 families.

References 

Populated places in Bam County